The 1991 Ontario municipal elections were held on November 12, 1991, to elect mayors, reeves, councillors, and school trustees in all municipalities across Ontario. Some communities also held referendum questions.

The most closely watched contest was in Toronto, where June Rowlands defeated Jack Layton for the mayoralty.

Results

Toronto

References